Emil Freiherr Marschalk von Ostheim (16 April 1841, Bamberg - 7 July 1903, Bamberg) was a German historian, numismatist and collector. His book collection can be found at Bamberg State Library.

Publications 

 Die Bamberger Hofmusik unter den drei letzten Fürstbischöfen. Festschrift zum 50jährigen Jubiläum des Liederkranzes Bamberg, Hübscher Verlag, Bamberg 1885

References

Bibliography 

 
 Wilhelm Schleicher: Die Sammlung Marschalk von Ostheim in der Staatsbibliothek Bamberg. In: "Frankenland“, Vol 20, Pages 115-118, 1968
 Rudolf M. Kloos: Nachlaß Marschalk von Ostheim Urkunden, in: "Bayerische Archivinventare“, Vol 38, Munich 1974

External links 
 Works by him in the Berlin State Library

1841 births
1903 deaths
German collectors
German numismatists
19th-century German historians
German male non-fiction writers